Ali Vitali is an American journalist, television analyst, and author.

Career 
Ms. Vitali was born on March 22, 1990  to Lou and Angela Vitale.  She grew up in Briarcliff Manor, New York with a younger sister.
She majored in Political Science and Communications with a minor in English and graduated as a Magna Cum Laude Presidential Scholar with Department Honors in 2012 from Tulane University.

In 2012, she was a Production and Development Assistant at ABC News. She worked at Sweet Lemon Media (2012–14) as VP and Managing Editor.

She covered the Donald Trump 2016 presidential campaign, and was a White House correspondent.

She was an embedded journalist on the Elizabeth Warren 2020 presidential campaign, helping to inform her book Electable. She also covered the Amy Klobuchar 2020 campaign,  and Michael Bloomberg 2020 campaign.

Works 

 Electable: Why America Hasn’t Put A Woman In The White House…Yet, Dey Street Books, 2022.

References

External links 
 https://alivitali.com/

American journalists
Tulane University alumni
Year of birth missing (living people)
Living people